There's Always a Woman is a 1938 American comedy mystery film directed by Alexander Hall and  starring Joan Blondell and Melvyn Douglas. Seeing the potential for a series, Columbia Pictures quickly made a sequel, There's That Woman Again, released the same year, with Douglas reprising his role, but with Virginia Bruce as Sally. No further sequels were made.

Plot
Bill Reardon's (Melvyn Douglas) private detective agency is not making any money, so he decides to swallow his pride and return to work for the district attorney as a special investigator. His wife Sally (Joan Blondell), who persuaded him to start his own business, decides to keep the agency going herself.

Sally is quickly hired by Lola Fraser (Mary Astor) to investigate Anne Calhoun (Frances Drake), a former girlfriend of Lola's husband Walter (Lester Matthews) who has been in contact with him. At a nightclub owned by Nick Shane (Jerome Cowan), pretending to be out with Bill for pleasure rather than business, Sally witnesses Anne's angry fiancé Jerry Marlowe (Robert Paige) threatening Walter, and before long Walter ends up dead.

Jerry is the prime suspect. Mr. Ketterling (Pierre Watkin), Jerry's employer, talks him into hiring Sally to prove him innocent. Shane could be behind it, she figures, but his body is found in the Reardons' apartment, where Sally catches a whiff of a familiar perfume, Lola's. Escaping police custody as a murder suspect, Sally gets Lola to sign a confession that she killed Shane in self defense by pretending to have found her handkerchief at the scene of the crime. However, Bill arrests Lola for hiring Shane to kill Walter to inherit all of his estate instead of getting a divorce settlement. When Shane started blackmailing her, she killed him.

Cast
 Joan Blondell as Sally Reardon
 Melvyn Douglas as William Reardon
 Mary Astor as Lola Fraser
 Frances Drake as Anne Calhoun
 Jerome Cowan as Nick Shane
 Robert Paige as Jerry Marlowe
 Thurston Hall as District Attorney
 Pierre Watkin as Mr. Ketterling
 Walter Kingsford as Grigson
 Lester Matthews as Walter Fraser
 Rita Hayworth as Mary, Ketterling's secretary (uncredited)

Reception
The New York Times called the film "one of the lightest and most engaging affairs of recent months" and "a 'Thin Man' of the lower-income brackets."

References

External links
 
 
 
 

1938 films
American black-and-white films
American crime comedy films
Columbia Pictures films
Films based on short fiction
Films directed by Alexander Hall
1930s crime comedy films
American comedy mystery films
1930s comedy mystery films
1938 comedy films
Films produced by William Perlberg
1930s American films